Aristotelia mirabilis is a moth of the family Gelechiidae. It is found in Portugal, Ukraine, Russia and Turkey.

References

Moths described in 1888
Aristotelia (moth)
Moths of Europe
Moths of Asia